The surname Grandis may refer to:
 David Grandis, a French conductor
 Jocelyn de Grandis (born 1980), a French Olympic archer
 Renato de Grandis (1927–2008), an Italian composer, musicologist, and writer

See also
 Grandis (disambiguation)

French-language surnames